Timothy J. Hallihan (7 July 1876 – 12 November 1955) was an Irish hurler who played with club side Ballincollig and at inter-county level with the Cork senior hurling team.

Playing career

Born in Ballincollig, Hallihan first played hurling as a member of the local club. His prowess at club level earned a call-up to the Cork senior hurling team for the 1901 Munster Championship and collected a winners' medal after victory over Clare. Hallihan later lined out when Cork suffered a defeat by London in the 1901 All-Ireland final. He won a second successive Munster Championship medal in 1902, but was not included on the team for their subsequent success in the 1902 All-Ireland final. Hallihan was recalled to the team for a brief appearance in the first round of the 1905 Munster Championship.

Honours

Cork
Munster Senior Hurling Championship (2): 1901, 1902

References

1876 births
1955 deaths
Ballincollig hurlers
Cork inter-county hurlers